Vidyasagar Assembly constituency was a Legislative Assembly constituency of Kolkata district in the Indian state of West Bengal.

Overview
As a consequence of the orders of the Delimitation Commission, VidyaSagar, West Bengal Assembly constituency ceases to exist from 2011.
 
It was part of Calcutta North East (Lok Sabha constituency).

Members of Legislative Assembly

Results

2006

 
  

.# Swing calculated on Trinamool Congress+BJP vote percentages taken together in 2006.

1977-2006
In the 2006 state assembly elections, Anadi Kumar Sahu of CPI(M) won the 157 Vidyasagar assembly seat defeating his nearest rival Pryal Chaudhury of Congress. Lakshmi Kanta Dey of CPI(M) defeated Mahua Mondal of Trinamool Congress in 2001. Tapas Roy of Congress defeated Dr Abir Lal Mukherjee of CPI(M) in 1996. Lakshmi Kanta Dey of CPI(M) defeated Tapas Roy of Congress in 1991, Samir Chakraborty of Congress in 1987, and Biren Mahanti of Congress in 1982. Samar Kumar Rudra of CPI(M) defeated Tapan Kumar Sikdar of Janata Party in 1977.

1951-1972
Md. Shamsuzzoha of Congress won in 1972 and 1971 defeating Samar Kumar Rudra of CPI(M) in both the years. Samar Kumar Rudra of CPI(M) won in 1969 defeating Mrinal Kanti Rudra of Congress. Narayan Chandra Roy representing CPI(M) won in 1967 defeating D.L.Dutt of Congress. Narayan Chandra Roy representing CPI won in 1962 defeating B.Halder of Congress and 1957 defeating Shankar Prasad Mitra of Congress. In independent India’s first election Narayan Chandra Roy, contesting as an Independent candidate won the Vidyasagar assembly seat defeating Nalin Chandra Pal of Congress.

References

Former assembly constituencies of West Bengal
Politics of Kolkata district